Sutton Waldron is a village and civil parish in north Dorset, England, situated on the A350 road between Iwerne Minster and Fontmell Magna, in the Blackmore Vale under the scarp of Cranborne Chase,  north of Blandford Forum and  south of Shaftesbury. In the 2011 census the parish had 93 dwellings, 87 households and a population of 200.

It was in the hundred of Gillingham and the lord and tenant-in-chief was Waleran the hunter.

The parish church dates from 1847 and is constructed in the Decorated Gothic style.

References

External links 

Civil parishes in Dorset
Villages in Dorset